Chatignonville is a commune in the Essonne department in Île-de-France in northern France.

Inhabitants of Chatignonville are known as Chatignonvillois.

References

External links

Mayors of Essonne Association 

Communes of Essonne